State Route 766 (SR 766) is a state highway in north central Nevada. It runs from the town of Carlin north to serve Newmont Mine.

Route description

State Route 766 begins in the center of Carlin in Elko County, at an intersection with 10th Street and Chestnut Street (Interstate 80 Business/SR 221). From there, the route heads northward along 10th Street, which becomes Newmont Mine Road. SR passes over Interstate 80 and then heads out of Carlin. The route passes by some light industrial and agricultural areas as it heads north-northwest. SR 766 begins to parallel Maggie Creek on its journey northward. The route travels another approximately  before coming to its terminus just north of the turnoff to Newmont Mine.

History
SR 766 was designated on July 1, 1976.

Major intersections

See also

References

766
Transportation in Elko County, Nevada
Transportation in Eureka County, Nevada